The current Minister of Works is Alexander Nanta Linggi on 10 March 2020. The Minister has been assisted by Deputy Minister, Arthur Joseph Kurup since August 2021. The Minister administers the portfolio through the Ministry of Works.

List of ministers of works
The following individuals have been appointed as Minister of Works, or any of its precedent titles:

Political party:

List of ministers of public amenities
The following individuals have been appointed as Minister of Public Amenities, or any of its precedent titles:

Political party:

References

Ministry of Works (Malaysia)
Lists of government ministers of Malaysia
Public works ministers
Construction ministers
Infrastructure ministers